Lieutenant-General Sir Frederick Wellington John Fitzwygram, 4th Baronet DL JP (29 August 1823 – 9 December 1904) was a British Army cavalry officer, expert on horses and Conservative politician.

Early life
Fitzwygram was born on 29 August 1823. He was the third son of Sir Robert Fitzwygram, 2nd Baronet, and his wife Selina Hayes. In 1832, his father legally changed their surname to Fitzwygram by Royal licence. An elder sister, Augusta Catherine Fitzwygram, married Sir George Baker, 3rd Baronet, and his youngest brother, Loftus Adam Fitzwygram, married Lady Frances Butler-Danvers (sister of John Butler, 6th Earl of Lanesborough).

He became a cavalry officer and served with the 6th (Inniskilling) Dragoons in the Crimean War. He subsequently commanded the Cavalry Brigade at Aldershot.

Career
In 1873 he inherited the Wigram Baronetcy on the death of his elder brother Robert. He purchased the Leigh Park estate, at Havant, in 1874 and developed the grounds and gardens which were frequently thrown open to the public. He was a member of the Royal College of Veterinary Surgeons,  and as president from 1875 to 1877 he unified the veterinary profession. He was active in public life.  From 1879 to 1884 he was Inspector-General of Cavalry at Aldershot.

Fitzwygram was elected as Member of Parliament for Hampshire South in a by-election in 1884, and when the constituency was restructured, he became MP for Fareham in 1885. He held the seat until 1900, being interested in military and horse related matters in the House of Commons. He wrote an influential book on the care and management of horses Horses and Stables which was first published by Longmans, Green, Reader and Dyer of London in 1869. He was an honorary member of the Manchester Unity of Independent Order of Oddfellows, Royal Naval Lodge, England.

Career
On 17 October 1882, Sir Frederick married Angela Frances Mary Vaughan, a daughter of Thomas Nugent Vaughan and Frances Mary ( Territt, formerly Viscountess Forbes) Vaughn. Her mother was the widow of George Forbes, Viscount Forbes, and from that earlier marriage, Angela had an older half-brother, George Forbes, 7th Earl of Granard, His maternal grandfather was William Territt of Chilton Hall. Together, they lived at Leigh Park at 20 Eaton Square, Belgravia, were the parents of two sons (only one survived childhood) and one daughter:

 Sir Frederick Loftus Francis Fitzwygram, 5th Baronet (1884–1920), who died unmarried.
 Angela Catherine Alice Fitzwygram (1885–1984), who died unmarried.

Sir Frederick died on 9 December 1904 and was succeeded in the baronetcy by his only son, Frederick.

Legacy
Fitzwygram's memorial in Havant church is the west window illustrating St. Gabriel and St. Michael.

Arms

References

External links 
 

1823 births
1904 deaths
6th (Inniskilling) Dragoons officers
British Army personnel of the Crimean War
Conservative Party (UK) MPs for English constituencies
Baronets in the Baronetage of the United Kingdom
UK MPs 1885–1886
UK MPs 1886–1892
UK MPs 1892–1895
UK MPs 1895–1900
British Army lieutenant generals